Batibot is a Philippine television educational show produced by the Philippine Children's Television Foundation (PCTF). It debuted in 1984 as the replacement of Sesame, a co-production of PCTV and the Children's Television Workshop (CTW) from 1983 to 1984.

History

Sesame (1983-1984)
The precursor of Batibot was Sesame, intended as the Filipino version of the American children's show, Sesame Street, which educates preschoolers through dance, song, and role-play educational skills through them. Sesame was a co-production of the Philippine Children's Television Foundation (PCTF) and the Children's Television Workshop (CTW) with support from the Philippine government. Sesame aired in 1983 as a bilingual (Filipino and English) program. The series featured two Muppet-style characters Pong Pagong and Kiko Matsing. Both characters were inspired from a Filipino fable, "The Monkey and the Turtle", which was annotated to English by José Rizal in 1889.

Government support ended in 1984 and the co-production arrangement with CTW was cancelled.

Batibot (1985-2002)
PCTF decided to produce its own show titled Batibot and debuted in February 1985. 
Batibot was conceptualized and produced by Feny Delos Angeles-Bautista, a teacher from the Community of Learners Foundation and writer Rene Villanueva. Unlike the bilingual (Filipino and English) Sesame!, Batibot was done entirely in Filipino and featured stories in a Philippine context. An arrangement with CTW was made in order for the characters Pong Pagong and Kiko Matsing to continue their appearance including one human character Kuya Mario.

Airing on weekdays with a time slot of 10:30 AM, the series consistently ranked in 1985 among the top 10 daytime shows in the Philippines, outdoing the ratings of Sesame! and Sesame Street, which first aired in the country in 1970.

By February 1989, the producers were experiencing financial constraints which placed uncertainty regarding the future airing of the show. PCTF were in negotiations for an Indonesian version of Batibot; coincidentally, CTW were also in negotiations for an Indonesian version of Sesame Street. Shortly thereafter, CTW informed PCTF of their decision to repossess the characters Pong Pagong and Kiko Matsing.  PCTF negotiated with CTW for the continued use of the characters for four more years under a license arrangement. Despite, the extension to use the characters, PCTF decided to phase out their appearances because of the costs. By 1994, the two characters were returned to CTW and were never used again.

In 1999, Batibot was relaunched as Batang Batibot airing on a Saturday morning timeslot.

Batibot ended its run in 2002.

TV5's Batibot (2010–2013)
TV5 announced in 2010 that it would revive Batibot. It premiered on November 27, 2010. TV5's version of Batibot featured a different set of human characters, Ate Maya and Kuya Fidel. Instead of a Monday–Friday broadcast format, the new series was aired on Saturday at 8:30 a.m. The airing of the series lasted until 2013.

Cast and characters

Batibot featured characters portrayed by puppets as well as human characters. Most of the puppets used for the show were locally made. Kiko Matsing and Pong Pagong who were among the main characters of the original Batibot were owned and crafted by CTW.

Sesame

Human characters
Kuya Mario portrayed by Junix Inocian
Ate Sylvia portrayed by Susan Africa
Luz portrayed by Dessa Quesada
Aling Nena portrayed by Angie Ferro
Mang Lino portrayed by Joe Gruta
Ben portrayed by Tito Quesada

Puppets
Kiko Matsing performed by Sammy Badon and assisted by Toots Javellana – a monkey 
Pong Pagong performed by Deo Noveno – a turtle

Batibot

Human characters
Kuya Mario* portrayed by Junix Inocian
Kuya Bodjie portrayed by Bodjie Pascua
Ate Sienna portrayed by  Sienna Olaso 
Kuya Ching portrayed by Ching Arellano
Kuya Dwight portrayed by  Dwight Gaston 
Ate Isay portrayed by Isay Alvarez-Seña
Mang Mokyo portrayed by Soliman Cruz
Popoy portrayed by Alvin Froy Alemania
Ate Jojie portrayed by Adriana Agcaoili
Rap Rap portrayed by Rafael Mallanes                                                                    
Ate Celia portrayed by Sheila Noreen Lopez Gamo
Kuya Mola portrayed by Gerry Sanga

Puppets
Kiko Matsing* performed by Sammy Badon and assisted by Toots Javellana 
Pong Pagong* performed by Deo Noveno
Irma Daldal - very talkative TV field reporter
Koko Kwik-Kwak – a bird character inspired from the Philippine Eagle, based from Big Bird of Sesame Street
Manang Bola – a forgetful fortuneteller
Kapitan Basa – a character who has a magic book which he uses to answer questions from children
Sitsiritsit and AlibangBang – a curious duo of space aliens
Ningning and Gingging– characters based from Ernie and Bert of Sesame Street
Kuya Derms (inspired by German Moreno aka "Kuya Germs") - a TV-host for Negoshowbiz (parody of NegoSiyete GMA-7) 
Noli de Casio (inspired by Noli de Castro) - a News anchor for Magandang Araw Bayan (parody of Magandang Gabi, Bayan ABS-CBN 2)
Angelique Baso (inspired by Angelique Lazo) - a TV-host for Balitang Bituin (parody of "Star News" segment of TV Patrol ABS-CBN 2)
The Byaps-Byaps

* – from Sesame

Batibot (2010)

Human characters
Kuya Fidel portrayed by Abner Delina
Ate Maya portrayed by Kakki Teodoro

Puppets
Irma Daldal*
Koko Kwik-Kwak*
Manang Bola*
Kapitan Basa*
Sitsiritsit* and AlibangBang*
Ningning* and Gingging*
Tarsi - a tarsier

* – from the original Batibot

Spin-offs
Batibot has its own spin-off program Koko Kwik Kwak (named after a bird character), which also aired on GMA Network from 1999 to 2002 every weekday mornings.

Mobile app

On August 14, 2015, Smart Communications launched a mobile app for Android devices based on the show. Smart together with the Community of Learners Foundation commissioned OrangeFix to develop the app.

The Batibot app is specifically targeted to children from kindergarten to Grade 3. It is aligned with the Department of Education's kindergarten curriculum and is in Filipino. An iOS version of the app was released on July 5, 2017.

References

External links
 

TV5 (Philippine TV network) original programming
1984 Philippine television series debuts
2003 Philippine television series endings
2010 Philippine television series debuts
2013 Philippine television series endings
ABS-CBN original programming
Filipino-language television shows
GMA Network original programming
People's Television Network original programming
Philippine animated television series
Philippine children's television series
Philippine television series based on American television series
Philippine television shows featuring puppetry
Puppetry in the Philippines
Radio Philippines Network original programming
Sesame Street international co-productions
Television series about monkeys
Television series about turtles